Jonathan Piers Daniel Linney (born 15 February 1971, in Stoke-on-Trent) is a British businessman and investor with a professional background in the City. Linney has been recognised as one of the top 100 Black Britons and is known as a champion of entrepreneurship and growth businesses.

Linney is a Non Executive Director of the UK government-owned development bank, British Business Bank, which has facilitated over £12 billion of financing for UK small and medium-sized businesses and also operates the StartUp Loan Company and British Patient Capital, a £2.5bn fund launched in 2018.

He was the Co-CEO and owner of Genesis Communications  and was the co-CEO of cloud-based IT business Outsourcery. He is best known for being a "dragon" on the BBC Two business series Dragons' Den (known as Shark Tank in the USA) from 2013 to 2015.

Linney also appeared on the Channel 4 series The Secret Millionaire in 2011, where he worked in Wolverhampton at a Young Offenders' institution.

In November 2018, Linney was named in the top 20 of Financial Times' list of the 'Top 100 minority ethnic leaders in technology.'  In 2018 he was also named in the Top 100 BAME Leaders in Business and was named in the FT as one of the top 100 BAME Leaders in Tech.

Piers is also content creator and public speaker focused on supporting entrepreneurs with ambitions to start-up or grow their businesses as part of his #ScaleUp initiative.

Early life
Linney was born to Derek and Norma Linney in 1971. He has Bajan (Barbados) and English heritage. He grew up in Stoke-on-Trent and moved aged nine to a small former mill-town called Bacup in Lancashire, where he attended the local secondary modern school (Fearns) after failing his eleven-plus exam.

Career
Linney studied Accounting and Law at The University of Manchester, and subsequently qualified as a solicitor with SJ Berwin. He then worked in investment banking, first at Barclays de Zoete Wedd, followed by Credit Suisse. Linney left banking in 2000 to start an internet business and has since been involved in a number of technology, media and telecommunications businesses. After becoming the CEO of a corporate finance boutique, Linney specialised in technology venture capital and securing structured equity and debt finance from US hedge funds for small and mid-cap listed companies.  Linney became a partner in a €90 million alternative investment fund providing structured debt and equity financing to small cap public companies.

In 2007, with his business partner Simon Newton, Linney led the buyout of Genesis Communications, a mobile voice and data reseller company. In 2009 Genesis acquired Thus Mobile from Cable&Wireless and rebranded as Outsourcery to focus on cloud IT and communications. In 2012 the mobile business arm was sold to Daisy Group for £15 million.

Outsourcery was floated on the Alternative Investment Market (AIM) in 2013 raising £13 million. The business was provided with a debt facility by Vodafone. In June 2016 the business was sold for an undisclosed sum and the company placed into administration, having reached revenues of £10m, but remaining unprofitable.

Linney was a founding member of the Governance Board of the UK's Cloud Industry Forum and has made appearance in the media to discuss the benefits of cloud computing. In 2014, Linney joined the Cabinet Office SME Panel, advising on small and medium business issues. Linney established the now defunct not-for-profit organisation workinsight.org, a national digital platform that connects young people to local employers.

Linney is a founding Trustee of the Powerlist Foundation, and is also a trustee of both the innovation charity Nesta and careers website Plotr. Linney is involved with Virgin Unite and a range of other charities as a donor or patron.

Awards
In 2013, Linney was recognised in the JP Morgan-sponsored Power List 2013 as one of the top 100 most influential black Britons. In 2014, Linney was named Entrepreneur Leader of the Year at the first Black British Business Awards sponsored by EY.

Dragons' Den

In 2013, Linney joined the panel on the BBC Two television series Dragons' Den, along with fellow new dragon Kelly Hoppen beginning in the eleventh series. In January 2015, Linney announced that he would be departing from the show at the end of series twelve, in order to focus on various other projects.  Linney invested in Wonderbly (formerly Lost My Name), an award winning independent technology and publishing business that offers personalised children's picture books. Launched in 2012, Wonderbly has sold over 2.7 million books in over two hundred countries around the world. Wonderbly raised $8.5m in 2017 from Ravensburger, a leading European publisher of games, puzzles, and children’s books and its existing investors include Google Ventures, Project A Ventures, Greycroft, The Chernin Group and Allen & Co.

Personal life
Linney married Tara Bishop and they have two children Tiger and Electra.  Linney and Bishop were divorced in 2018.

References

External links
 

Living people
English businesspeople
English television personalities
English people of Barbadian descent
1971 births